Torgo (Torğo) is an urban locality (an urban-type settlement) in Olyokminsky District of the Sakha Republic, Russia, located  from Olyokminsk, the administrative center of the district. It had no recorded population as of the 2010 Census.

Geography
The settlement is located in the Olyokma-Chara Plateau, on the left bank of the Torgo, a tributary of the Tokko.

History
Urban-type settlement status was granted to Torgo in 1977.

Administrative and municipal status
Within the framework of administrative divisions, the urban-type settlement of Torgo is incorporated within Olyokminsky District as the Settlement of Torgo. Within the framework of municipal divisions, Torgo is a part of Tyansky Rural Settlement within Olyokminsky Municipal District.

References

Sources
Official website of the Sakha Republic. Registry of the Administrative-Territorial Divisions of the Sakha Republic. Olyokminsky District. 

Urban-type settlements in the Sakha Republic